Blissestraße is a Berlin U-Bahn station located on the .
Designed by G. R. Rümmler and opened in 1971, it has a ceiling with cement caskets that reflect the light in an unusual way.

References

U7 (Berlin U-Bahn) stations
Buildings and structures in Charlottenburg-Wilmersdorf
Railway stations in Germany opened in 1971